The 1991 IAAF Grand Prix Final was the seventh edition of the season-ending competition for the IAAF Grand Prix track and field circuit, organised by the International Association of Athletics Federations. It was held on 20 September at the Estadi Olímpic Lluís Companys in Barcelona, Catalonia, Spain.

Sergey Bubka (pole vault) and Heike Henkel (high jump) were the overall points winners of the tournament. They were the first field athletes to win the series, all previous winners having come from track events. The programme featured 17 athletics events, ten for men and seven for women, marking a reduction by one from the last series.

The competition preceded the 1992 Barcelona Olympics, which hosted its athletics competition at the same location a year later.

Medal summary

Men

Women

Points leaders

Men

Women

References
IAAF Grand Prix Final. GBR Athletics. Retrieved on 2015-01-17.

External links
IAAF Grand Prix Final archive from IAAF

Grand Prix Final
Grand Prix Final
Athletics competitions in Catalonia
Sports competitions in Barcelona
1990s in Barcelona
IAAF Grand Prix Final
IAAF Grand Prix Final
International athletics competitions hosted by Spain
Athletics in Barcelona